Ubach may refer to:

Übach-Palenberg, town in Germany
Ubach over Worms, village in the Netherlands
Ubach creek, watercourse in Western Australia

See also
Ubach (surname)